John F. Murray was a Commissioner of Public Works and the second borough president of The Bronx district of New York City, United States. In 1909 he was appointed acting borough president upon the removal of Louis F. Haffen by New York Governor Charles Evans Hughes. He was then elected interim borough president for the remainder of Haffen's term by a unanimous vote of the eight aldermen representing The Bronx on the New York City Board of Aldermen.
At the time Murray was serving as the Commissioner of Public Works.
Murray did not run for election for the 1910 term, and he was succeeded by Cyrus C. Miller.
Murray suffered from Bright's disease and anemia for about a year before dying on December 31, 1928 in a Metropolitan Life Insurance Company sanitarium in Mount McGregor, New York.

See also
 Timeline of the Bronx, twentieth century.

References

Bronx borough presidents
1862 births
1928 deaths